The Moldovan Women's Football Championship (Romanian: Campionatul Moldovei la Fotbal Feminin) is the top level women's football league of Moldova. It is organized by the national women's football association (Romanian: Asociatia Fotbalului Feminin din Moldova).

The winning team of the league qualifies for a spot in the UEFA Women's Champions League.

Clubs

2016-2017:

Format
The teams play each other twice per season. Rankeing is determined by points. Three points per win, one point per draw, if teams are tied in points, the tiebreakers are in descending order:
 points earned in direct matches
 goal difference in direct matches
 goal difference accumulated in all matches
 number of goals scored during all matches
 number of victories in all matches
 the number of yellow and red cards received in all matches

List of champions 
The list of champions:
1996–97: Codru Chisinau
1997–98: Codru Chisinau
1998–99: Constructorul Chisinau
1999–00: Constructorul Chisinau
2004–05: FC Codru Anenii Noi
2005–06: Narta Chișinău
2006–07: Narta Chișinău
2007–08: Narta Chișinău
2008–09: Narta Chișinău
2009–10: FC Roma Calfa
2010–11: Goliador Chişinău
2011–12: Noroc Nimoreni
2012–13: Goliador Chişinău
2013–14: Goliador Chişinău
2014–15: Noroc Nimoreni
2015–16: ARF Criuleni
2016–17: Noroc Nimoreni
2017–18: Agarista-ȘS Anenii Noi
2018–19: Agarista-ȘS Anenii Noi
2019–20: Agarista-ȘS Anenii Noi
2020–21: Agarista-ȘS Anenii Noi
2021–22: FC Maksimum Cahul

Performance by club

References

External links 
Federation Website
League at UEFA

Top level women's association football leagues in Europe
Championship
Football leagues in Moldova
Women's sports leagues in Moldova